Elvira (minor planet designation: 277 Elvira) is a typical main belt asteroid and is a member of the Koronis asteroid family. It was discovered by Auguste Charlois on 3 May 1888 in Nice. (277) Elvira is possibly named for a character in Alphonse de Lamartine's  Méditations poétiques (1820) and Harmonies poétiques et religieuses (1830).

A group of astronomers, including Lucy D’Escoffier Crespo da Silva and Richard P. Binzel, used observations made between 1998 through 2000 to determine the spin-vector alignment of the Koronis family of asteroids, including 277 Elvira. The collaborative work resulted in the creation of 61 new individual rotation lightcurves to augment previous published observations.

Measurements of the thermal inertia of 277 Elvira give a value of around 190 J m−2 K−1 s−1/2, compared to 50 for lunar regolith and 400 for coarse sand in an atmosphere.

References

External links 
 
 

000277
Discoveries by Auguste Charlois
Named minor planets
000277
18880503